The Kuban State University ( KubSU) is a university in Krasnodar, in the Kuban area of southern Russia. It was founded on September 19, 1920, and since then it has trained over 100,000 specialists, including over 1,000 foreign students.

Memberships and recognition
KubSU is a member of the European University Association and a member of the US Incorporated Research Institutions for Seismology (IRIS).

KubSU is a member of the Eurasian University Association and the Federal Center of Science and High Technology “All-Russian Scientific-Research Institute for the Problems of Civil Defense and Emergency Situations of the Russian Federation.”

KubSU is a participant in the Black Sea Economic Cooperation (BSEC)

In 1994, KubSU was ranked by the Russian Government as one of the leading institutions of higher education in Russia.

In 2002 the Kuban State University was awarded the gold medal for business reputation; in 2004-2005 it was included in the 100 of best Russian higher education institutions and awarded the gold medal of “European Quality”.

The KubSU president in 1982–2008 was V.A. Babeshko, full member of the Russian Academy of Sciences, and a laureate of the Russian State Prize. In 2004–2005 he was awarded an honorary breastplate “Rector of the Year”, the medal of Kuban Hero of Labor and “Sign of Honor” Order.

Academics
KubSU is a complex of 16 branches and over 40 educational and research centers. The system of KubSU branches covers the whole territory of Southern Russia: Armavir, Gelendzhik, Goryachy Klyuch, Korenovsk, Kropotkin, Leningradskaya stanitsa, Novorossiysk, Otradnenskaya stanitsa, Pavlovskaya, Stavropol, Tikhoretsk, Ust'-Labinsk.

Over 8,000 students study at the KubSU affiliates in seven specialties:
Law
Accounting and audit
State and municipal management
Finance, credit and currency circulation
Philology. Teacher of two foreign languages
Psychology
Fine arts and drawing

KubSU incorporates over 30 educational and research centers:
State Research Center for Forecasting and Prevention of Geological and Man-Caused Disasters
Regional Northern Caucasus Education-Research Center for Information Security
Center of International Educational Programs
Internet Center and others.

KubSU has a system of additional education:
inter-branch regional center for professional skills improvement and personnel retraining
department of professional skills improvement for teachers of specialized colleges and higher education institutions with 1000 candidates admitted annually
Kuban branch of the Rostov Institute for retraining and professional skills improvement for teachers of the humanities and social sciences
“university” educational and methodical center for additional education services and preparatory training, which includes 24 education subdivisions

Faculties
The university comprises 17 faculties:
Mathematics
Applied Informatics
Physics and Technology
Chemistry
Biology
Geography
History, Sociology and International Relations
Law
Philology
Romano-Germanic Philology
Journalism
Fine Arts and Drawing
Architecture and Design
Economics
Management and Psychology
Faculty of Pedagogy, Psychology and Communication Sciences
Computer Technologies and Applied Mathematics

Research work and scientific study
KubSU carries out research work on scientific and technical programs, Russian and international projects. Among classical institutions of higher education of the Krasnodar region, the KubSU has the largest amount of scientific and research investigations: In 2005 they amounted to 118 million rubles.

Research results and scientific concepts have been described in monographs, articles, educational and methodical manuals published by professors and lecturers of the university. The scientific output of the university is sold to the USA, Germany, the Great Britain, Japan.

There are 15 higher degree boards, including 13 higher doctoral boards. More than 400 postgraduates and people working for a higher doctoral degree attend postgraduate and postdoctoral studies.

The university is responsible for the implementation of regional programs on estimation of the seismicity of the Krasnodar region and lowering the risk of natural disasters. This work is performed to the order of the Administration and the Legislative Assembly of the Krasnodar region.

The Kuban State University comprises 15 scientific-research institutes, the “university” scientific-technological park, and 12 educational-and-research centers. The university’s science-intensive products have been exhibited at Russian and foreign exhibitions in Paris, Brussels, and Milan. Over 50 medals have been received; over 80 exhibits have been awarded diplomas.

KubSU possesses facilities for conducting scientific experiments; laboratories and testing grounds in the area of Gelendzhik and the Lago-Naki plateau provide students with the opportunity to carry out scientific experiments and field studies.

Faculty
Over 1,300 lecturers work at the university, including three full members of the Russian Academy of Science, over 40 members and associate members of other Russian academies, prize laureates and honoured scientists.

Student life

In 85 years over 100,000 specialists have graduated from KubSU, including 1,000 foreign students.

The university has a tourist center, a theater club, a dance club, meetings of the “Wiseguys and Wisecracks” club take place regularly, sports competitions are held.

Non-residents of Krasnodar live on campus, which accommodates a healthcare center.

The Students’ Organization of KubSU is one of the largest trade union organizations in the Krasnodar region. It comprises 17 trade union organizations of the university faculties. The trade union committee consists of five boards: organizational issues, housing, information, culture and education, and sports and health improvement. The activities of the trade union organization are primarily aimed at the protection of its members’ rights, representation of their interests to the KubSU administration. The trade union organization has organized summer vacations, and every year students have a chance to spend their vacation at the university student camp “Raduga” at the Black Sea coast.

The Youth Cultural and Leisure Center was founded 1 December 1994, and has since then held over 400 concerts, “Wiseguys and Wisecracks” games, exhibitions, etc. In the framework of the center, clubs and studios are functioning:
theatre club
vocal-choral studio
pop dances and modern plastic arts studios
fine arts studio

Internet center and library
The Internet Center was opened in KubSU with the support of the “Open Society” Institute (Soros Foundation). It has become the center of the regional information network with high-speed connection combining educational, scientific and cultural resources of the Krasnodar region (KUBANnet).

The university participates in the Russian-American project aimed at developing the Russian-American cooperation through the application of new generation telecommunication technologies: MIRNET. The participation of Kuban University in the project is provided with a direct communication channel with the USA which makes it possible to establish visual communication between scientists working in higher education institutions and scientific-research centers of Russia and the USA.

The scientific library is the main methodological center for the libraries of other higher education institutions and colleges of the Krasnodar region.

Today the library holdings amount to about 1,100,000 editions. It has a collection of rare books dating back to the 17th to early 20th centuries, numbering 7,000 items as well as a collection of works of KubSU scientists.

Partnerships and academic relations
The Kuban State University maintains international scientific and schooling academic relations and contacts with universities and research centers. The University has concluded over 50 international agreements with educational institutes of different countries. International relations have been developing with universities and institutes in Italy, Germany, the USA, the Great Britain, France, Greece, and Turkey.

The Kuban State University trains foreign citizens: every year up to 200 students from the countries of Europe, America, CIS, Asia and the Middle East attend. The university is the only institute of the south of Russia where students groups from the USA, the Great Britain, Belgium and Austria study. Every year over 40 students of the university go to foreign educational institutions. In the past five years, over 300 post-graduates and students and over 100 lecturers have had internships abroad.

The university is a member of the Eurasian Association: It carries out research on international and Russian grants. In 1999, KubSU was elected a member of the US Incorporated Research Institutions for Seismology (IRIS). The university is involved in the implementation of international projects.

Notable alumni
 Scientist Ivan Peronko
 Artist Sergei Vorzhev
 editor-in-chief RT Margarita Simonyan
 TV Presenter Maria Minogarova

References

External links
www.kubsu.ru
Community of students Krasnodar (Kuban State University Section)

 
Universities in Krasnodar